Tan Aik Huang  (born 14 February 1946) is a retired Malaysian badminton player noted for his footwork and patience. He is the elder brother of Tan Aik Mong.

Career 
In 1966 he won the men's singles at the All England Open Badminton Championships, then considered the unofficial World Badminton Championships, defeating Japan's Masao Akiyama in the finals. This came during a run of four straight appearances in the All England finals from 1965 through 1968. He lost hard-fought matches to Erland Kops in '65 and '67 and to Rudy Hartono in '68. Tan was a member of four Malaysian Thomas Cup (men's international) teams including its world champion team of 1967. He won numerous major international singles titles during the mid- and late 1960s including the Danish Open, the US Open,  the Canadian Open, and the Malaysian Open. He won both singles and doubles at the British Commonwealth Games of 1966.

Achievements

Southeast Asian Peninsular Games 
Men's singles

Commonwealth Games 
Men's singles

Men's doubles

International tournaments 
Men's singles

Men's doubles

Honour 
  :
 Member of the Order of the Defender of the Realm (AMN) (1968)

References

Malaysian sportspeople of Chinese descent
Malaysian people of Teochew descent
Malaysian male badminton players
1946 births
Living people
Commonwealth Games gold medallists for Malaysia
Badminton players at the 1966 British Empire and Commonwealth Games
Commonwealth Games medallists in badminton
Southeast Asian Games medalists in badminton
Southeast Asian Games gold medalists for Malaysia
People who lost Singaporean citizenship
Singaporean emigrants to Malaysia
Members of the Order of the Defender of the Realm
Competitors at the 1965 Southeast Asian Peninsular Games
Competitors at the 1971 Southeast Asian Peninsular Games
Medallists at the 1966 British Empire and Commonwealth Games